
San José Lake is a lake in the Beni Department of central Bolivia. East of the city of Trinidad the lake sits at an elevation of 202 m, its surface area is 14.7 km².

Lakes of Beni Department